The 2018 Money in the Bank was the ninth annual Money in the Bank professional wrestling pay-per-view (PPV) and livestreaming event produced by WWE. It was held for wrestlers from the promotion's Raw and SmackDown brand divisions. The event took place on June 17, 2018, at the Allstate Arena in the Chicago suburb of Rosemont, Illinois, and was the second Money in the Bank held at this venue after the 2011 event.

Eleven matches were contested at the event, including one on the Kickoff pre-show. In the main event, Raw's Braun Strowman won the men's Money in the Bank ladder match. In addition, Raw's Alexa Bliss won the women's Money in the Bank ladder match and cashed in her contract later in the night to win the Raw Women's Championship from Nia Jax after causing a disqualification in the previous title match between Ronda Rousey and Jax. Other prominent matches saw AJ Styles retain SmackDown's WWE Championship against Shinsuke Nakamura in a Last Man Standing match, and Carmella defeated Asuka to retain the SmackDown Women's Championship.

The event received a mixed to positive reception from critics, with the ladder matches, WWE Championship, Raw Women's Championship, and the Intercontinental Championship matches garnering the most praise. However, the remaining matches from the card, including the Bobby Lashley vs. Sami Zayn match and the Roman Reigns vs. Jinder Mahal match, were negatively received.

Production

Background 
Money in the Bank is an annual gimmick pay-per-view (PPV) and WWE Network event produced by WWE since 2010, generally held between June and July. The concept of the show comes from WWE's established Money in the Bank ladder match, in which multiple wrestlers use ladders to retrieve a briefcase hanging above the ring. The briefcase contains a contract that guarantees the winner a match for a world championship at any time within the next year. While the 2017 event was a SmackDown-exclusive PPV, 2018 featured both the Raw and SmackDown brand divisions as WWE discontinued brand-exclusive PPVs after WrestleMania 34 in April. The 2017 event also introduced the first women's Money in the Bank ladder match, with the 2018 event including both a men's and women's ladder match, which is now standard. For 2018, the contracts in the briefcases granted the winners a world championship match of their respective brands, and each match featured eight wrestlers, evenly divided between the two brands. Male wrestlers competed for a contract to grant them a match for either Raw's Universal Championship or SmackDown's WWE Championship, while female wrestlers competed for a Raw Women's Championship or SmackDown Women's Championship match contract. The ninth Money in the Bank was scheduled to be held on June 17, 2018, at the Allstate Arena in the Chicago suburb of Rosemont, Illinois. Tickets went on sale on March 5 through Ticketmaster.

Storylines 
The show comprised 11 matches, including one on the Kickoff pre-show, which resulted from scripted storylines, where wrestlers portrayed heroes, villains, or less distinguishable characters in scripted events that built tension and culminated in a wrestling match or series of matches. Results were predetermined by WWE's writers on the Raw and SmackDown brands, while storylines were produced on WWE's weekly television shows, Monday Night Raw and SmackDown Live.

Raw 
Qualifying matches for the men's Money in the Bank ladder match began on the May 7 episode of Raw. In the first match, Braun Strowman qualified by defeating Kevin Owens. In the second, Finn Bálor defeated Sami Zayn and Roman Reigns in a triple threat match after interference from Jinder Mahal. The following week, two more triple threat matches took place. In the first, Bobby Roode defeated Baron Corbin and No Way Jose to qualify, while in the second, Owens, who replaced Mahal after the latter was attacked backstage by Reigns, defeated Elias and Bobby Lashley to qualify after interference from Zayn.

Qualifying matches for the women's ladder match also began on the May 7 episode of Raw. Ember Moon defeated Sasha Banks and Ruby Riott in a triple threat match to qualify. The following week, Alexa Bliss defeated Bayley and Mickie James, also in a triple threat match, to qualify. On the May 21 episode, Natalya defeated Liv Morgan, Sarah Logan, and Dana Brooke in a fatal four-way match to qualify. The final qualifying match took place on the May 28 episode, where Banks defeated the other women who lost their respective Money in the Bank qualifying matches in a gauntlet match to earn the final spot.

During the NBCUniversal Upfront event on May 14, Ronda Rousey was interviewed by television presenter Cathy Kelley. Raw Women's Champion Nia Jax interrupted the interview and challenged Rousey to a match for the title at Money in the Bank, and Rousey accepted. The two signed the contract for their match the following week. The bout would be Rousey's first singles match in WWE.

On the May 28 episode of Raw, Seth Rollins interrupted Elias, who was trying to sing for the crowd as a part of his gimmick, and forced him to leave. After Rollins' successful Intercontinental Championship defense, Elias smashed a guitar on his back. On May 31, a match between the two for the Intercontinental Championship was scheduled for Money in the Bank.

On the May 14 episode of Raw, after Jinder Mahal cost Roman Reigns a chance to qualify for the Money in the Bank ladder match the previous week, Reigns attacked him backstage, resulting in a brawl that ended with Reigns spearing Mahal through a wall backstage, costing him his spot in a Money in the Bank qualifying match. On the May 21 episode, after Reigns and Seth Rollins defeated Mahal and Kevin Owens in a tag team match, Mahal attacked Reigns with a chair. Later that night, a match between the two was scheduled for Money in the Bank.

During a tag team match on the April 23 episode of Raw, Bobby Lashley performed a one-handed suspended vertical suplex on Sami Zayn, which Zayn claimed gave him vertigo and why he missed the Greatest Royal Rumble. At Backlash, Lashley and Braun Strowman defeated Kevin Owens and Zayn in a tag team match. During an interview on the May 7 episode of Raw, Lashley spoke dearly about his family, including his three sisters. In response, Zayn said that Lashley was not a nice guy and promised to bring out Lashley's sisters to tell the truth. On the May 21 episode, three men dressed up as Lashley's sisters accused Lashley of violence. Lashley interrupted the segment and attacked the imposters along with Zayn. The following week, a match between the two was scheduled for Money in the Bank.

SmackDown 
Qualifying matches for the men's ladder match continued on the May 8 episode of SmackDown. The Miz and Rusev defeated Jeff Hardy and Daniel Bryan, respectively, to qualify. The following week, Big E and Xavier Woods of The New Day defeated Cesaro and Sheamus in a tag team match, allowing one member of The New Day to qualify. Samoa Joe secured the final spot by defeating Bryan and Big Cass in a triple threat match on the May 29 episode.

Qualifying matches for the women's ladder match also continued on the May 8 episode of SmackDown, with Charlotte Flair defeating Peyton Royce to qualify. The following week, Becky Lynch defeated Mandy Rose and Sonya Deville in a triple threat match to qualify. On the May 22 episode, Lana and Naomi qualified by defeating Billie Kay and Deville, respectively, in singles matches.

At WrestleMania 34, AJ Styles defeated Shinsuke Nakamura to retain the WWE Championship. After the match, Nakamura attacked Styles with a low blow, turning heel in the process. The two continued to feud through Greatest Royal Rumble and Backlash with their matches ending in draws. On May 14, SmackDown commissioner Shane McMahon announced a rematch between them for the fourth time at Money in the Bank, stating that every wrestling fan was "looking for a definitive winner". On the May 15 episode of SmackDown, Nakamura defeated Styles in a non-title match to pick the stipulation for the match, and chose a Last Man Standing match.

On the May 15 episode of SmackDown, SmackDown General Manager Paige interrupted SmackDown Women's Champion Carmella's celebration of her reign and scheduled a title match between her and Asuka for Money in the Bank.

On the May 22 episode of SmackDown, Luke Gallows and Karl Anderson defeated The Usos (Jey Uso and Jimmy Uso) to become the number one contenders for the SmackDown Tag Team Championship, which was held by The Bludgeon Brothers (Luke Harper and Erick Rowan). The match was subsequently scheduled for Money in the Bank, and was later scheduled for the Kickoff pre-show.

Big Cass and Daniel Bryan began feuding after the former returned from injury during the 2018 WWE Superstar Shake-up. Cass continued to taunt Bryan on the May 1 episode of SmackDown by calling him "small and weak" and declaring himself to be "a real WWE superstar" while beating up a midget dressed like Bryan. Their feud intensified when Cass eliminated Bryan from the Greatest Royal Rumble match. This led to a match between the two at Backlash where Bryan won, but after the match, Cass attacked Bryan. Bryan returned the favor by attacking Cass during the May 15 episode of SmackDown and at a house show in Germany, where he injured Cass' leg. As a result, Bryan not only cost Cass his spot in an upcoming Money in the Bank qualifying match against Joe, but secured that spot for himself by beating Jeff Hardy on the May 22 episode. However, when Cass recovered and appeared the following week, the bout was turned into the aforementioned triple threat match, won by Joe. Following the match, Cass attacked Bryan again. On June 2, a rematch between the two was scheduled for Money in the Bank.

Event

Pre-show 
During the Money in the Bank Kickoff pre-show, The Bludgeon Brothers (Harper and Rowan) defended the SmackDown Tag Team Championship against Luke Gallows and Karl Anderson. In the end, Harper and Rowan performed The Reckoning on Gallows to retain the titles.

Preliminary matches 
The actual pay-per-view began with Big Cass taking on Daniel Bryan. Cass began by getting a two-count after performing a spinning side slam on Bryan, who retaliated by targeting Cass' left knee with kicks and two dragon screw legwhips. Bryan then slammed Cass' knee into the ring apron and ring post. Cass responded by using a tilt-a-whirl hold on Bryan, who then reversed the hold into a Yes! Lock. Cass reached the ropes to escape the submission and dominated Bryan by gaining a two-count twice and performing a Big Boot for a nearfall. In the climax, Bryan performed a running knee on Cass, who was about to put Bryan in a torture rack, and forced him to submit to a heel hook to win the match.

In the second match, Bobby Lashley took on Sami Zayn. Lashley performed a fallaway slam, a spinebuster, and three vertical suplexes on Zayn to win the match.

In the third match, Seth Rollins defended the Intercontinental Championship against Elias. The bout opened with Elias dominating the first half of the match with a series of dropkicks and Stomps on Rollins before performing a DDT for a nearfall. Rollins countered with a suicide dive and a Blockbuster from the second turnbuckle. Both wrestlers exchanged intense nearfalls, one of which involved Rollins using a Superplex followed by a Falcon Arrow and another where Elias performed an Elbow Drop from the top rope. In the end, Rollins pinned Elias with a roll-up whilst holding Elias' tights to retain the title.

The fourth match was the Women's Money in the Bank Ladder match, featuring Ember Moon, Alexa Bliss, Natalya, and Sasha Banks from Raw and Becky Lynch, Naomi, Lana, and Charlotte Flair from SmackDown. At the beginning of the match, Moon landed a Somersault Senton on Lynch and slammed Banks through a ladder with a Springboard Dive. Soon after chopping Natalya, Flair tried to use a ladder to get the briefcase but was interrupted by Lynch, who fought over possession of the ladder. Naomi then dropkicked the ladder to take down both the wrestlers. Midway through the match, Lana placed another ladder adjacent to another one occupied by Lynch and Banks to get the briefcase. Moon and Natalya interfered, with Natalya pulling Banks off the ladder and executing a Slingshot Powerbomb on her through the ladder, knocking it off along with Lynch on it in the process. Flair also grabbed hold of Moon and Powerbombed Lynch onto the ladder knocked off by Natalya. Bliss intervened and performed a Code Red on Flair. In the closing moments, Lynch attempted to get the briefcase after performing an exploder suplex on Flair, but Bliss tipped the ladder over, causing Lynch to fall. Bliss ascended the ladder and unhooked the briefcase to win the match.

In the fifth match, Roman Reigns faced Jinder Mahal, who was accompanied by an injured Sunil Singh in a wheelchair. As Reigns dominated Mahal in the beginning of the match, Singh rose from his wheelchair and pushed Reigns into the ring post. Mahal took advantage of this by stomping Reigns and applying a Chin Lock. Reigns initially fought out of it but Mahal immediately went for a series of rest holds. Reigns came back at Mahal with Leaping Clotheslines. In the climax, Singh attempted to interfere but Reigns performed a Superman Punch and a Spear on him. Mahal subsequently rolled up Reigns for a nearfall, but Reigns recovered and performed a Spear on Mahal to win the match.

In the sixth match, Carmella defended the SmackDown Women's Championship against Asuka. Carmella began by executing kicks to Asuka's knees and head before Asuka countered with a Kneebar. Carmella managed to get out of the hold by touching the ropes. Asuka then performed a High Knee, following it up with a German Suplex. As Asuka connected with a kick to Carmella and was about to pin her, she was distracted by a person masquerading as her. The masked figure was revealed to be a returning James Ellsworth. Carmella took advantage of the distraction and performed a superkick on Asuka to retain the title.

After that, AJ Styles defended the WWE Championship against Shinsuke Nakamura in a Last Man Standing match. Early in the match, Nakamura aggressively countered Styles' Phenomenal Forearm by kicking Styles' leg. He then went for a low blow but Styles avoided it and landed a Pelé Kick. Midway through the bout, Nakamura performed a Kinshasa on Styles on top of the German broadcast table, but Styles stood at a nine count. Nakamura threw Styles through a table, which was positioned in the corner in the ring, only for Styles to stand at a nine count. Styles began to target Nakamura's leg and applied the Calf Crusher on Nakamura. Styles began to strike Nakamura with a chair. As Nakamura begged Styles to stop, Styles relented. Seizing the moment, Nakamura retaliated with a low blow, but Styles managed to stand at an eight count. At ringside, Nakamura performed another Kinshasa on Styles, who stood at a nine count. Styles then performed a Phenomenal Forearm off a broadcast table on Nakamura and followed up with a Styles Clash off the steel steps, with Nakamura standing at a nine count. In the end, Styles performed another Phenomenal Forearm on Nakamura through one of the broadcast tables. Nakamura could not stand up by the ten count, thus Styles retained the title.

Next, Nia Jax defended the Raw Women's Championship against Ronda Rousey. Jax initially dominated by tossing Rousey across the ring twice and applying the Samoan Drop. As Rousey countered with a kimura lock, Jax overcame it and slammed Rousey with a sitout powerbomb. As Jax went for another sitout powerbomb, Rousey used the hurricanrana throw, but Jax caught and dropped her for a two count. Rousey came back by applying the armbar over the ropes on Jax and performed a crossbody for a two count. In the climax, Jax countered an armbar into a roll-up for a two count. Rousey then performed a modified Rock Bottom on Jax and looked for the armbar again, but Alexa Bliss appeared and attacked Rousey with the Money in the Bank briefcase to cause a disqualification, allowing Jax to retain. Bliss further attacked Rousey and Jax before cashing the contract in. Bliss performed a Bliss DDT and Twisted Bliss on Jax to win the title for a third time.

Main event 
The main event was the men's Money in the Bank ladder match, featuring Braun Strowman, Finn Bálor, Bobby Roode, and Kevin Owens from Raw and The Miz, one member of The New Day, revealed to be Kofi Kingston, Rusev, and Samoa Joe from SmackDown. All of the participants immediately attacked Strowman at the start of the match, and buried him underneath a pile of ladders. Each one vied for the ladder with The Miz going first before Kingston performed Trouble in Paradise on Miz. Owens performed a Superkick on Kingston only to be knocked out by a double foot stomp from Bálor.

Strowman recovered midway through the bout and attacked Bálor and Kingston. Together, Joe, Owens, and Rusev temporarily subdued Strowman and placed him on a table, with Owens climbing a large ladder adjacent to the tables to leap unto Strowman. Strowman broke free, climbed the ladder, and threw Owens through the table himself. Joe then attacked Strowman with a ladder and clotheslined him over the top rope. Bálor then dropkicked Strowman but was subsequently interrupted by Joe. Rusev and Joe then fought it out with each applying The Accolade and the Coquina Clutch, respectively, on one another. Rusev got the better of Joe with a Superkick and climbed the ladder. The Miz then toppled the ladder, causing Rusev to fall. The Miz was then confronted by Kingston and traded blows while on opposite sides of the ladder. Roode then knocked both The Miz and Kingston over and proceeded to ascend the ladder. Bálor interfered by kicking Roode and executing a Coup de Grâce off a ladder outside the ring.

In the climax, Bálor ascended the ladder and attempted to get the briefcase, only to be stopped by Strowman, who pulled him off. Strowman then performed Running Powerslams on both Miz and Joe. Bálor and Strowman ascended the opposite sides of the ladder placed below the Money in the Bank contract briefcase when Kingston jumped onto Strowman's back. Strowman pushed both the wrestlers off and unhooked the briefcase to win the match.

Reception 
Money in the Bank received mixed-to-positive reviews from critics. While positive feedback was directed at the ladder matches, the WWE, Intercontinental, and Raw Women's championship matches, most of the negativity was directed at the Reigns vs. Mahal match, as well as the Lashley vs. Zayn match.

Ryan Dilbert of Bleacher Report stated that the event "felt like it belonged alongside the company's Big Four pay-per-views". Dilbert gave praise to the Last Man Standing match. He gave the match a grade of A, calling it "a dramatic, emphatic title bout with a string of memorable spots". Dilbert noted that AJ Styles and Shinsuke Nakamura "delivered a strong climax to their rivalry here", and that they "looked like warriors". Dilbert praised both Money in the Bank ladder matches. He gave the men's ladder match an A grade, stating that the match "was a thriller filled with touches of comedy, memorable facial expressions", and that Braun Strowman throwing Kevin Owens off a ladder and through a table "will be shown on highlights for years to come". Dilbert dubbed Strowman as "the centerpiece of the buildup of the bout and now emerges from Chicago armed with the Money in the Bank briefcase". Dilbert gave the women's ladder match a grade of B+, finding it to be "a fun, nutty contest", and that the match was "wilder and more dangerous than the first women's Money in the Bank ladder match". However, he said that at times, the match "felt too choreographed as it moved from spot to spot with little room to breathe". Dilbert gave the Raw Women's Championship match an A- grade, stating Rousey and Jax "were well on their way to a full-on banger" and that "a number of small things felt like big moments". He found Alexa Bliss' Money in the Bank cash-in to be "an exciting swerve", saying that "Bliss vs. Rousey has massive potential if that's the direction they're going". Dilbert criticized the Lashley vs. Zayn match, giving it a D grade and felt that it was "forgettable" due to "repetitive offense and a lack of emotion" and that the match "was a suplex exhibition that didn't connect". Also, he said that the rivalry "has done nothing for either man". He also condemned the Reigns vs. Mahal match, giving it a grade of D-. He opined that fans chanting things like "Johnny Gargano!" to "This match sucks!" gave the feeling that they "weren't into this match in the least", and that "WWE following a familiar script with Reigns battling from underneath led to a boring, lifeless match".

Brian Campbell of CBS Sports stated that the event's final three matches "helped save the show in front of a smart and passionate Chicago crowd". He denounced the Lashley vs. Zayn match, giving it a grade of D, stating that "Lashley's first WWE PPV match in over a decade proved nearly as forgettable as the puzzlingly awful build to get to it". He also wondered how WWE "decided against playing the pre-match video package highlighting how we got here". He also gave the Reigns vs. Mahal match a grade of D, stating that "it didn't take three minutes for the match to start before the Chicago crowd drowned the action", as they chanted things like "this is awful", "CM Punk", "end this match", "boring", and "NXT" while the match was underway. However, he gave praise to the Last Man Standing match, which he gave a grade of B+. Campbell stated that the match "turned out to be the best of all, even if it was violently unconventional". He also said that it "took more than two-thirds of the match to come close to the intensity and drama of its climax", and that the ending delivered. Campbell gave the women's Money in the Bank ladder match a grade of C+, stating that during the match, "there were a number of obvious timing and psychology issues, including multiple performers choosing to take out already fallen opponents on the canvas with a move instead of climbing the ladder or preventing someone else who was seemingly inches away from winning". He also said that Alexa Bliss deserved to win that match the least, stating that Becky Lynch and Sasha Banks were more deserving of that win, along with "the storyline potential opposite Ronda Rousey that could've come with Natalya winning". He gave the men's Money in the Bank ladder match a grade of B, stating that Braun Strowman's win and being called "Mr. Monster in the Bank" was "somehow both highly predictable and curiously surprising at the same time". Campbell said that "WWE appears to be listening to the fans who have helped make Strowman arguably the most over superstar in the company and appear poised to give him a huge push entering the summer". Campbell gave the Raw Women's Championship match a grade of A-, stating that Ronda Rousey "remains nothing short of a natural inside the ring", and that Rousey's first WWE match "turned out to be one heck of a piece of business". He also said that the match "deserves credit for how well it was booked", and that the match was "fantastic", but Alexa Bliss' Money in the Bank cash-in was "an even better swerve finish".

Dave Meltzer of the Wrestling Observer Newsletter  rated the matches. The highest rated matches of the event were the men's Money in the Bank ladder match (4.25 stars), the Last Man Standing match, and the women's Money in the Bank ladder match (both at 4 stars). The other rated matches at the event included the Intercontinental Championship match and the Raw Women's Championship match, both getting 3.5 stars, Daniel Bryan vs. Big Cass getting 2.75 stars, Roman Reigns vs. Jinder Mahal getting 2.5 stars, the SmackDown Tag Team Championship getting 2 stars, the SmackDown Women's Championship match getting 1.5 stars, and the Bobby Lashley vs. Sami Zayn match being the lowest rated match of the event, getting only 1.25 stars.

Aftermath

Raw 
New Raw Women's Champion Alexa Bliss opened the following Raw to talk about her championship win. It was also announced that Nia Jax invoked her championship rematch clause for Extreme Rules. Ronda Rousey interrupted, and after Bliss gave some insults, Rousey attacked Bliss, General Manager Kurt Angle, and a few referees. This resulted in Rousey being suspended for 30 days. At Extreme Rules, Bliss, accompanied by Mickie James, defeated Jax in an Extreme Rules match to retain the title; during the match, Rousey (who attended the event as a fan) attacked James. The following night on Raw, Rousey attacked James and Bliss, and was given a one-week extension of her suspension, but also a match against Bliss for the Raw Women's Championship at SummerSlam if she did not break her suspension. At the event, Rousey dominated and defeated Bliss to win the title for the first time.

Kevin Owens and men's Money in the Bank winner Braun Strowman would start a feud, leading to a Steel Cage match at Extreme Rules. Owens won the match when Strowman tossed him off the cage and through an announce table. They faced each other again at SummerSlam with the Money in the Bank contract on the line, with Strowman winning this time. Also at the event, Roman Reigns defeated Brock Lesnar to win the Universal Championship. Strowman then cashed in the contract on Reigns ahead of time, announcing he would face Reigns in a Hell in a Cell match for the title at Hell in a Cell, which ended in a no-contest when Lesnar attacked both men. This made Strowman the fourth person to fail to win a world championship in their Money in the Bank cash-in match, and the first to fail by a no-contest ruling.

SmackDown 
On the following episode of SmackDown, Rusev, The Miz, Daniel Bryan, Samoa Joe, and Big E competed in a gauntlet match to determine the new number one contender for AJ Styles' WWE Championship at Extreme Rules. The match was won by Rusev, who last eliminated The Miz.

Also on that same episode, The Bludgeon Brothers (Harper and Rowan) and Luke Gallows and Karl Anderson had a rematch for the SmackDown Tag Team Championship, where The Bludgeon Brothers again retained.

During the aforementioned gauntlet match, Daniel Bryan was attacked by SmackDown Tag Team Champions The Bludgeon Brothers (Harper and Rowan), resulting in his elimination. The following week, Kane returned to save Bryan from a post-match assault from The Bludgeon Brothers, reuniting Team Hell No. SmackDown General Manager Paige then scheduled Team Hell No to face The Bludgeon Brothers for the SmackDown Tag Team Championship at Extreme Rules.

Also on the following SmackDown, SmackDown Women's Champion Carmella attacked Asuka after a distraction by James Ellsworth. The following week, General Manager Paige scheduled a rematch between Carmella and Asuka for the SmackDown Women's Championship at Extreme Rules with Ellsworth suspended above the ring in a shark cage.

Results

References

External links 
 Official website for this event
 WWE's official YouTube videos regarding the event

2018 in Illinois
2018 WWE Network events
2018 WWE pay-per-view events
Events in Rosemont, Illinois
June 2018 events in the United States
Professional wrestling in the Chicago metropolitan area
2018